The English comic, singer and actor George Formby (1904 – 1961) performed in many mediums of light entertainment, including film, radio and theatre. His career spanned from 1915 until December 1960. During that time he became synonymous with playing "a shy, innocent, gauche, accident-prone Lancashire lad".

Formby began his working life as a jockey but always held an ambition to become a performer. In 1915, against the wishes of his father, Formby made his screen debut in the film By the Shortest of Heads.  Upon his father's death in 1921, he began to build a full-time performing career, and worked predominantly on the variety circuit. In 1926 he began his music career, singing light, comical songs, and playing the ukulele or banjolele. From 1934 he increasingly worked in film, and had become a major star by the 1930s and '40s. He appeared on television for the first time in 1938 in the festive special Christmas Greetings. He became the UK's highest-paid entertainer during those decades. The film historian Brian McFarlane writes that Formby portrayed "essentially gormless incompetents, aspiring to various kinds of professional success ... and even more improbably to a middle-class girlfriend, usually in the clutches of some caddish type with a moustache. Invariably he scored on both counts".

During the Second World War Formby joined the Entertainments National Service Association (ENSA), and entertained civilians and troops; by 1946 it was estimated that he had performed in front of three million service personnel. Formby appeared in his final film role in 1946, the commercially unsuccessful George in Civvy Street. He toured Canada, Australia, South Africa and Sweden and appeared on local and national radio during his travels. He continued to record songs and appear on television into the 1950s; on 16 December 1960 he appeared in The Friday Show: George Formby in a farewell programme looking back at his life. His biographer, David Bret, observes that the show is "generally regarded as George's greatest performance—it was certainly his most sincere".

Formby died of a heart attack in 1961. His biographer, the academic Jeffrey Richards, considers that Formby "had been able to embody simultaneously Lancashire, the working classes, the people, and the nation", also observing that "his passing was genuinely and widely mourned".

Filmography

Stage credits

Formby appeared on stage in numerous variety and music hall performances, although no full record exists. He appeared in variety shows and concerts for troops with the Entertainments National Service Association (ENSA) during the Second World War, as well as in regular winter pantomime in the 1950s, Babes in the Wood at the Liverpool Empire Theatre.

Recordings

Radio

Television

Notes and references
Notes

References

Sources

External links
 
 
 
 
 George Formby on Pathé News
George Formby Net Worth 

Discographies of British artists
Male actor filmographies
British filmographies